Mary Isabel Fraser (20 March 1863 – 18 April 1942) was a New Zealand teacher, school principal and educationalist. 

Throughout her career as a teacher and then as a school principal, she was a strong advocate for girls' education.

She is also known for having introduced, after returning from a trip to Yichang in China, the first kiwifruit seeds in New Zealand, in 1904. This allowed nurseryman Alexander Allison to grow plants from these seeds, and it was from this experience that the worldwide kiwifruit industry developed.

References

1863 births
1942 deaths
Schoolteachers from Dunedin